Events from the year 1569 in India.

Events
 February 8 – March 21 – Siege of Ranthambore
 Kuchera uprising against Mughal rule
 Sadasiva Raya rule as the emperor of Vijayanagara Empire ends with his death (started 1542)
 Aliya Rama Raya becomes emperor of Vijayanagara Empire

Births
 Prince Salim (later named Jahangir) was born to Akbar.

Deaths
 Sadasiva Raya, emperor of Vijayanagara Empire

See also

 Timeline of Indian history